Art Marcum and Matt Holloway are an American screenwriting duo, best known for writing the scripts of Iron Man and Punisher: War Zone.

Career 
In 2008, Marcum and Holloway wrote the script of Marvel Studios' superhero film Iron Man, which was directed by Jon Favreau and released on May 2, 2008, by Paramount Pictures. The duo also wrote the script for the action film Punisher: War Zone, directed by Lexi Alexander and released on December 5, 2008, by Lionsgate. They were hired by Paramount to co-write a script with John Fusco for the 2014 Teenage Mutant Ninja Turtles film, but their script was ultimately never used. In 2019, they were hired by Sony to write the script for the adventure film Uncharted, directed by Ruben Fleischer. In 2020, it was revealed that the duo had provided rewrites for two projects in the Sony's Spider-Man Universe: The first being Morbius (2022), directed by Daniel Espinosa. The other being Kraven the Hunter (2023), directed by J. C. Chandor.

Filmography 
 Shadow of Fear (2004)
 Iron Man (2008)
 Punisher: War Zone (2008)
 Transformers: The Last Knight (2017)
 Men in Black: International (2019)
 Uncharted (2022)
 Kraven the Hunter (2023)

References

External links 
 
 

Living people
American male writers
American male screenwriters
American screenwriters
Screenwriting duos
Year of birth missing (living people)